Meykharan or Meykhoran or Meykhowran, also rendered as Maikhoran or Mey Kharan or  Mae Khuran or Maekharan or Makhran, may refer to:
Meykharan-e Mohammad Aqa
Meykharan-e Mohammad Sadeq
Meykharan-e Pir Ali Khan
Meykharan-e Sadat